Massachusetts House of Representatives' 3rd Suffolk district in the United States is one of 160 legislative districts included in the lower house of the Massachusetts General Court. It covers part of the city of Boston in Suffolk County. Democrat Aaron Michlewitz of the North End has represented the district since 2009.

The current district geographic boundary overlaps with those of the Massachusetts Senate's 1st Suffolk and Middlesex district and 2nd Suffolk district.

Representatives
 Peter Higgins, circa 1858 
 Asa D. Pattee, circa 1858-1859 
 John C. Tucker, circa 1859 
 John E. Hayes, circa 1888 
 John W. O'Neil, circa 1888 
 Thomas H. Green, circa 1920 
 John Francis Harvey, circa 1920 
 Christopher A. Iannella, circa 1951 
 Gabriel Francis Piemonte, circa 1951 
 Katherine Kane, 1965-1968
 O. Roland Orlandi, circa 1975 
 Salvatore DiMasi
 Aaron M. Michlewitz, 2009-current

See also
 List of Massachusetts House of Representatives elections
 Other Suffolk County districts of the Massachusetts House of Representatives: 1st, 2nd,  4th, 5th, 6th, 7th, 8th, 9th, 10th, 11th, 12th, 13th, 14th, 15th, 16th, 17th, 18th, 19th
 List of Massachusetts General Courts
 List of former districts of the Massachusetts House of Representatives

Images
Portraits of legislators

References

External links
 Ballotpedia
  (State House district information based on U.S. Census Bureau's American Community Survey).
 League of Women Voters of Boston

House
Government of Suffolk County, Massachusetts